Deepak Chahar (born 7 August 1992) is an Indian international cricketer. He is a right-arm medium pace swing bowler, who plays for Rajasthan in domestic cricket and Chennai Super Kings in the Indian Premier League.

In 2019, he became the first Indian male cricketer to take a hat-trick in a Twenty20 International (T20I) match. In January 2020, Chahar was awarded with the T20I Performance of the Year award by the International Cricket Council (ICC), after taking six wickets for seven runs against Bangladesh.

Early life and family
Chahar was born in 1992 in Agra, Uttar Pradesh. His father, Lokendra Singh Chahar is retired from the Indian Air Force and his mother, Pushpa Chahar, is a homemaker. He has one elder sibling Malti Chahar, who is a Bollywood film actress.

He proposed to his girlfriend Jaya Bhardwaj during his team's last league-stage match of the 2021 Indian Premier League. On 1 June 2022 the couple were married in Agra.

Domestic career
Chahar took eight wickets for 10 runs (8/10) against Hyderabad on his first-class cricket debut in the 2010–11 Ranji Trophy; Hyderabad were bowled out for 21 runs, the lowest total in Ranji Trophy history. Chahar's swing bowling soon earned him a youth contract with Rising Pune Supergiants, an Indian Premier League Twenty20 cricket franchise. In October 2016, he worked with international coaches Ian Pont and Catherine Dalton in Jaipur as part of Rajasthan's development camp.

In January 2018, he was bought by Chennai Super Kings in the 2018 IPL auction. In October 2018, he was named in the India B squad for the 2018–19 Deodhar Trophy. In February 2022, he was bought by Chennai Super Kings in the auction for the 2022 Indian Premier League tournament. However, he was later ruled out of the tournament due to a back injury.

International career
In May 2018, Chahar was named in India's Twenty20 International (T20I) squad for the team's tour of England. He made his T20I debut on 8 July 2018, taking one wicket. He made his One Day International debut against Afghanistan in September 2018 during the 2018 Asia Cup.

Chahar was selected in the Indian Twenty20 squad against West Indies in 2019, playing in the final match of the series and winning the player of the match award after taking three wickets for four runs. He was subsequently selected for the three-match T20I series against Bangladesh. In the final match of the series he set new best bowling figures in a men's T20I, with six wickets for seven runs from 3.2 overs. During the series, he also took the first hat-trick by a bowler for India in T20I and his first five-wicket haul in T20Is.

In July 2021, Chahar scored his maiden ODI half-century, and in September was named as one of three reserve players in India's squad for the 2021 ICC Men's T20 World Cup. In January 2022, he scored his second half century in ODIs against South Africa.

Notes

References

External links 

Living people
1992 births
Indian cricketers
India One Day International cricketers
India Twenty20 International cricketers
Rajasthan cricketers
Rajasthan Royals cricketers
Sportspeople from Agra
Rising Pune Supergiant cricketers
Chennai Super Kings cricketers
Indian A cricketers
Twenty20 International hat-trick takers